The distancing effect, also translated as alienation effect ( or V-Effekt), is a concept in performing arts credited to German playwright Bertolt Brecht.

Brecht first used the term in his essay "Alienation Effects in Chinese Acting" published in 1936, in which he described it as performing "in such a way that the audience was hindered from simply identifying itself with the characters in the play. Acceptance or rejection of their actions and utterances was meant to take place on a conscious plane, instead of, as hitherto, in the audience's subconscious".

Origin 
The term Verfremdungseffekt is rooted in the Russian Formalist notion of the device of making strange (приём отстранения priyom otstraneniya), which literary critic Viktor Shklovsky claims is the essence of all art. Lemon and Reis's 1965 English translation of Shklovsky's 1917 coinage as "defamiliarization", combined with John Willett's 1964 translation of Brecht's 1935 coinage as "alienation effect"—and the canonization of both translations in Anglophone literary theory in the decades since—has served to obscure the close connections between the two terms. Not only is the root of both terms "strange" (stran- in Russian, fremd in German), but both terms are unusual in their respective languages: ostranenie is a neologism in Russian, while Verfremdung is a resuscitation of a long-obsolete term in German. In addition, according to some accounts, Shklovsky's Russian friend playwright Sergei Tretyakov taught Shklovsky's term to Brecht during Brecht's visit to Moscow in the spring of 1935. For this reason, many scholars have recently taken to using estrangement to translate both terms: "the estrangement device" in Shklovsky, "the estrangement effect" in Brecht.

It was in any case not long after returning in the spring of 1935 from Moscow, where he saw a command performance of Beijing Opera techniques by Mei Lanfang, that Brecht first used the German term in print to label an approach to theater that discouraged involving the audience in an illusory narrative world and in the emotions of the characters. Brecht thought the audience required an emotional distance to reflect on what was being presented in critical and objective ways, rather than being taken out of themselves as conventional entertainment attempts to do.

The proper English translation of Verfremdungseffekt is a matter of controversy.  The word is sometimes rendered as defamiliarization effect, estrangement effect, distantiation, alienation effect, or distancing effect. This has caused some confusion for English scholars who confuse the German word Verfremdung with Entfremdung. In Brecht and Method, Fredric Jameson abbreviates Verfremdungseffekt as "the V-Effekt"; many scholars similarly leave the word untranslated.

Brecht wanted to "distance" or to "alienate" his audience from the characters and the action and, by dint of that, render them observers who would not become involved in or to sympathize emotionally or to empathize by identifying individually with the characters psychologically; rather, he wanted the audience to understand intellectually the characters' dilemmas and the wrongdoing producing these dilemmas exposed in his dramatic plots. By being thus "distanced" emotionally from the characters and the action on stage, the audience could be able to reach such an intellectual level of understanding (or intellectual empathy); in theory, while alienated emotionally from the action and the characters, they would be empowered on an intellectual level both to analyze and perhaps even to try to change the world, which was Brecht's social and political goal as a playwright and the driving force behind his dramaturgy.

Techniques 
The distancing effect is achieved by the way the "artist never acts as if there were a fourth wall besides the three surrounding him ... The audience can no longer have the illusion of being the unseen spectator at an event which is really taking place". The use of direct audience-address is one way of disrupting stage illusion and generating the distancing effect. In performance, as the performer "observes himself", his objective is "to appear strange and even surprising to the audience. He achieves this by looking strangely at himself and his work". Whether Brecht intended the distancing effect to refer to the audience or to the actor or to both audience and actor is still controversial among teachers and scholars of "Epic Acting" and Brechtian theatre.

By disclosing and making obvious the manipulative contrivances and "fictive" qualities of the medium, the actors attempt to alienate the viewer from any passive acceptance and enjoyment of the play as mere "entertainment". Instead, the goal is to force viewers into a critical, analytical frame of mind that serves to disabuse them of the notion that what they are watching is necessarily an inviolable, self-contained narrative. This effect of making the familiar strange serves a didactic function insofar as it aims to teach the viewer not to take the style and content for granted, since (proponents argue) the theatrical medium itself is highly constructed and contingent upon many cultural and economic conditions.

It may be noted that Brecht's use of distancing effects in order to prevent audience members from what he characterizes as bathing themselves in empathetic emotions and to draw them into an attitude of critical judgment may lead to other reactions than intellectual coolness.  Brecht's popularization of these effects has come to dominate the understanding of its dynamics. But the particulars of a spectator's psyche and of the tension aroused by a specific alienating device may actually increase emotional impact. Audience reactions are rarely uniform, and there are many diverse, sometimes unpredictable, responses that may be achieved through distancing.

Actors, directors, and playwrights may draw on alienating effects in creating a production. The playwright may describe them in the script's stage directions, in effect requiring them in the staging of the work. A director may take a script that has not been written to alienate and introduce certain techniques, such as playing dialogue forward to remind the audience that there is no fourth wall, or guiding the cast to act "in quotation marks". The actor (usually with the director's permission) may play scenes with an ironic subtext. These techniques and many more are available for artists in different aspects of the show. For the playwright, reference to vaudeville or musical revues will often allow rapid segues from empathy to a judgmental attitude through comic distancing. A notable example of such estrangement in an English-language script can be found in Brendan Behan's The Hostage (1958).

Distancing effects in non-Brechtian performances 
Brecht's idea of distancing effects has garnered academic interest from a number of researchers in various non-Brechtian performances. Although the term "distancing effect" was first coined by Brecht, the concept has appeared before his usage. Among some notable studies on distancing effects in non-Brechtian performances are: Ta'ziyeh (Shi'ite ritualistic passion play) (Mohd Nasir et al., 2020), Marathi theatre (Mujumdar, 2013), Swang theatre (ancient Indian folk theatre) (Sharma & Kashyap, 2018), beat poetry (Rissover, 2009), Likay (Thai folk theatre) (Tungtang, 2015), and Quranic narratives (Dina, 2014).

Rissover's paper discusses the integration of twenty poems (which were either excerpted or taken as whole) by nine Beat poets into the performance of Edward Albee's The American Dream. While Rissover does not exclusively consider distancing effects of Beat Poetry as a poetry performance, the paper still demonstrates how beat poetry is able to project distancing effects to the audience.

Additionally, Mujumdar's paper (2013) examined the elements of epic drama (which includes distancing effects) in Tamasha, a traditional form of Marathi theatre. Mujumdar argues that distancing effects have already been present in Tamasha; albeit the concept itself has yet been conceptualized or coined during the 18th century (i.e. the time whereby Tamasha was considered as the popular folk arts). Through songs, narratives, dances, music, and commentaries that are embedded within Tamasha, the audience is said to be unconsciously performing a social role and achieving the distancing effects advocated by Brecht.

Furthemore, Paradee's (2015) article emphasized that the extensive use of the Verfremdungseffekt (the V-effect) or "alienation effect" can be found commonly in Thai Likay theatre. Even though Likay is performed in a way which could be perceived as evoking Brecht's alienation effect, Brechtian acting troupes and Thai Likay troupes approaches are distinctly different. While the goal for Brecht's alienation effect in the western theatre is to make the audience always aware that they are watching a play, and not being "taken out of themselves" and thus not being distracted from the main meaning of the story, Thai Likay aims to do otherwise.

See also

 Bertolt Brecht
 Defamiliarization
 Epic theatre
 Theatre of the Absurd
 Hal Hartley
 Harun Farocki
 Jean-Luc Godard
 Lars von Trier
 Metafiction
 Nagisa Oshima
 Rainer Werner Fassbinder
 Toshiki Okada

References

Further reading

 
 Jameson, Fredric. Brecht and Method. London and New York: Verso, 1998.  (10).   (13).
 Min Tian, The Poetics of Difference and Displacement: Twentieth-Century Chinese-Western Intercultural Theatre. Hong Kong: Hong Kong University Press, 2008.
 Robinson, Douglas. Estrangement and the Somatics of Literature: Tolstoy, Shklovsky, Brecht. Baltimore and London: Johns Hopkins University Press, 2008.
 Squiers, Anthony. An Introduction to the Social and Political Philosophy of Bertolt Brecht: Revolution and Aesthetics. Amsterdam: Rodopi. 2014. .
 Willett, John, ed. and trans. Brecht on Theatre: The Development of an Aesthetic. London: Methuen, 1964. . New York: Hill and Wang, 1964. .

Bertolt Brecht theories and techniques
Cinematic techniques
Film theory
Metafictional techniques